The Department of Further and Higher Education, Research, Innovation and Science is a department of the Government of Ireland. It is led by the Minister for Further and Higher Education, Research, Innovation and Science.

Departmental team
The departmental team consists of the following:
Minister for Further and Higher Education, Research, Innovation and Science: Simon Harris, TD
Minister of State for Skills and Further Education: Niall Collins, TD.
Secretary General of the Department: Jim Breslin

History
The Department of Further and Higher Education, Research, Innovation and Science was created by the Ministers and Secretaries and Ministerial, Parliamentary, Judicial and Court Offices (Amendment) Act 2020 as part of the reorganisation of governmental departments in the government of Micheál Martin.

Transfer of functions

References

External links
Department of Further and Higher Education, Research, Innovation and Science

Further and Higher Education, Research, Innovation and Science
Ireland, Further
Department of Further and Higher Education
Ireland, Further
Education in the Republic of Ireland
Further and Higher Education
Ireland
Ireland
Ireland